Ayala Hetzroni (also "Hezroni"; אילה חצרוני; born June 15, 1938) is an Israeli former Olympic shotputter. She was Israeli Women's Champion in 1960 and 1962.

She was born in Haifa, Israel, and is Jewish.

Shot put career
Hetzroni's personal best in the shot put is 13.02 metres, which she recorded in 1960, setting a new Israeli record three months before the Olympics.  She was the Israeli Women's Champion in 1960 and 1962.

Hetzroni competed for Israel at the 1960 Summer Olympics in Rome, Italy, at the age of 22. In the Women's Shot Put she came in 17th with a best distance of 12.59 metres.

She won a gold medal in shotput at the 1961 Maccabiah Games.

References 

Israeli female shot putters
Athletes (track and field) at the 1960 Summer Olympics
Living people
Jewish female athletes (track and field)
Jewish Israeli sportspeople
Olympic athletes of Israel
1938 births
Maccabiah Games gold medalists for Israel
Maccabiah Games medalists in athletics
Competitors at the 1961 Maccabiah Games
20th-century Israeli women